Joseph N. Hermann (June 8, 1924 in Boston, Massachusetts – May 20, 1993 in North Andover, Massachusetts) was an American politician who was a member of the Massachusetts House of Representatives from 1977 until his death on May 20, 1993.

References

1924 births
1993 deaths
Politicians from Boston
Democratic Party members of the Massachusetts House of Representatives
20th-century American politicians